Mohanagar is a Bangladeshi drama streaming television series created by Ashfaque Nipun. Starring Mosharraf Karim as the Officer in Charge (OC) of Kotwali police station, Dhaka. The series consisting of eight episodes premiered on 25 June 2021 on Hoichoi. Khairul Basar, Shamol Mawla, Nishat Priom, Mostafizur Noor Imran, Nasir Uddin Khan, Zakia Bari Momo, Shahed Ali co-starred.

Premise
Sub-inspector Moloy Kumar (Mostafizur Noor Imran) got a tip from one of his trusted informers that a wanted criminal returned to the capital. He went on the hunt for this criminal with his superior officer in charge Harun (Mosharraf Karim) in the middle of the night. In the meantime, police arrested Afnan Chowdhury (Shamol Mawla), the son of an influential businessman and politician accused of a hit and run case. Afnan's Father sent his counselor (Shahed Ali) to the police station and told him to negotiate with old friend OC Harun to bring Afnan out of this mess. But things got tougher when AC Shahana Huda (Zakia Bari Mamo) came to the scene. She started trying to spoil OC Harun's attempt of saving Afnan.

Cast 
 Mosharraf Karim as Harun Ur Rashid
 Shamol Mawla as Afnan Chowdhury
 Nishat Priom as Rumana Malik
 Khairul Basar as Abir Hasan
 Lutfur Rahman George as Alamgir Kabir
 Nasir Uddin Khan as Mugger Kaisar
 Zakia Bari Mamo as Shahana Huda
 Shahed Ali as Amzad Khan
 Quazi Nawshaba Ahmed as Special Appearance
 Jibon Ray as The Eye-Witness
 Rishad Mahmud as Police

Episodes

Series 1 (2021)

Release
On 19 Jun 2021, the official trailer for the series was released on Hoichoi's YouTube channel.

Awards

See also
 Unoloukik
 Taqdeer
Robindronath Ekhane Kawkhono Khete Aashenni
 Ladies & Gentleman
 August 14

References

External links
 Mohanagar on Hoichoi
 

Bengali-language web series
Bangladeshi web series
2021 Bangladeshi television series debuts
Television series created by Ashfaque Nipun
2020s Bangladeshi drama television series
Police corruption in fiction
Hoichoi original programming